Emergency Assist is a driver assistance system that monitors driver behavior by observing delays between the use of the accelerator and the brake; once a preset threshold of time has been exceeded the system will take control of the vehicle in order to bring it to a safe stop.

This technology is actually a merging of several Level 1 self-driving car technologies, such as Adaptive Cruise Control, Side Assist, Lane Assist, and Park Assist that are utilize to effectively achieve a Level 3 operation, the single environment in which the vehicle operates automatically being when it infers that there is an emergency. Most vehicle manufacturers now offer an Emergency Driver Assistant feature on their more recent, high-end models, taking advantage of the standardization of low-level driver assistance systems in such models. Such manufacturers include Tesla, Inc., Volkswagen, and Audi.

Automated cars

A level 3 vehicle is actually considered the first tier of highly automated vehicles, so vehicles equipped with this technology could be considered automated vehicles, although only in a very limited sense. Automated vehicles have what are referred to as Operational Design Domains (ODDs) which are individual sets of conditions under which the vehicle can operate automatically. The primary difference between Level 3 automated vehicles and higher levels of automation is that a Level 3 can only operate in one particular set of conditions, or ODD. Such conditions might be on a highway with limited access, during the daytime with no inclement weather, at a certain speed. The ODD under which the Emergency Driver Assistant system is operating is even more narrowly define, simply being a time frame within which the vehicle controls have not be operated while the vehicle is in motion and the functionality is to bring the vehicle to a stop safely rather than any prolonged driving activity.

Market penetration

Penetration needs
Emergency Driver Assistant technology continues to be one of the most popular driver assistance technologies  and, along with other assorted driver assistance technologies, are posed to become ubiquitous within the next decade. This popularity is considered by many experts to be the path forward for acclimating the public to automated vehicle technology and eventually full automation, especially amongst older drivers.

EU market
Since 24 February 2011, all new vehicles (passenger car and light commercial) have to be equipped with brake assist systems (known has BAS) as standard in the European Union.

Since 2015, advanced emergency braking systems (known as AEBS) in mandatory in the new heavy-duty vehicles in the EU.

Regulation (EU) 2019/2144 plans to make advanced emergency braking (known as AEB) mandatory for all new cars.

Potential drawbacks
This technology does have potential drawbacks, at least in the short term. Primarily, the success of the technology relies on a high market penetration rate; if it has low market penetration then it could potentially cause problems with drivers that are used to the presence of the technology not having it when they operate older vehicles. Additionally, there are driving environment situations in which the system would not be able to come to a safe stop, such as in dense traffic at high speed, and there is little information on how the system would handle this situation, especially given that prolonged operation would introduce too many variables for the system to compensate. Still, it bears mentioning that ubiquitous presence of such systems would be a net gain for traffic safety; the technology will aggregate some percentage of these types of emergencies, saving lives that would otherwise have been lost.

Emergency stop signal

In the European Union, the emergency stop signal (ESS) or emergency braking display (EBD) is defined as a "signal to indicate to other road users to the rear of the vehicle that a high retardation force has been applied to the vehicle relative to the prevailing road conditions."

The emergency stop signal works with the simultaneous operation of all the stop or direction-indicator lamps flashing at a frequency of around 4 Hertz.
In Australia and in the European Union, lamps of the emergency stop signal may emit amber or red light.

It is assumed that EBD is very efficient.

EU vehicles might have the emergency stop signal (ESS) and/or rear-end collision alert signal (RECAS) both defined by unece regulation #48 but this signal is optional.

See also
 Emergency brake assist (increases braking in some circumstances, unece regulation 139)
 Autonomous emergency braking (initiates braking, unece regulation 131)
 Emergency steering function  (unece regulation 79)
 eCall / Emergency response system (unece regulation 144)

References 

Vehicle safety technologies